The men's 400 metres race was the second-shortest of the flat-track events on the Athletics at the 1896 Summer Olympics programme. The competition's preliminary round was the last held on the first day, 6 April. The competitors were split into two groups. The top two runners in each heat advanced to the final, which was held on the second day, 7 April.

7 athletes from 4 nations competed. 5 of those athletes were also in the 100 metres.

Background

Thomas Burke of the United States and Edgar Bredin of Great Britain were the "two best one-lap runners in 1896"; Burke came to Athens, but Bredin did not (having become a professional earlier that year). Bredin was the co-holder of the unofficial world record at 48.5 seconds (440 yards). Burke had beaten Bredin in 1895.

Competition format

The 400 metres consisted of two rounds: heats and a final. Each race was "slightly over one lap in length, with no lanes to separate the runners." Two heats were held, with 4 runners in one and 3 runners in the other. The top 2 runners in each heat advanced to the final.

The track was 330 metres in circumference (unlike modern tracks which are 400 metres), so the race was slightly more than one lap. The track had very sharp turns and was made of loose cinders, making running difficult. Runners turned clockwise rather than the current counterclockwise turns.

Records

Jamison set the initial Olympic record of 56.8 seconds in the first heat; Burke beat it in the final at 54.2 seconds.

Schedule

The precise times of the events are not recorded. For the first round, the heats were the final event of the day on Monday; the "sun was setting" and "the air had become decidedly cold." The final was held during the afternoon session on Tuesday, which began at 2:30 p.m.; the hurdles and long jumping competitions took place before the 400 metres final.

Results

Semifinals

The semifinals were held on 6 April. The top two placers in each of the two groups advanced.

Semifinal 1

Jamison won by 13½ yards. Hofmann and Grisel both had to run 401.83 metres after being penalized for false starts. The final positions of Grisel and Dörry are unclear. Jamison set the initial Olympic record at 56.8 seconds, which would hold only until the next day.

Semifinal 2

Burke won by 15 yards, despite being tired from already having run in the heats of the 100 metres. Gmelin beat Reichel by 12 yards for second place.

Final

Burke beat Jamison by eight yards, with Gmelin beating Hofmann by a foot for third.

Results summary

References

  (Digitally available at la84foundation.org)
  (Excerpt available at la84foundation.org)
 

Men's 0400 metres
400 metres at the Olympics